Academy Earth is an American quarterly magazine for young readers. It is an omnibus of both mainstream school subjects and uncommon subjects. It is designed to expose adolescents to as many forms of intellect, providing them a solid base of knowledge for further learning, and to present it in such a way that a child is not offended by its overly-scholarly nature.

Renaissance Method
Taking directly from Piaget's model of cognitive development, which brings to light the underestimated logical ability of a child, and the Montessori method, which understands that children are simply not "small adults" but humans that have their own way of learning and understanding, the Renaissance Method presents introductions to all subjects, but allows the adolescent to choose his favorite, or the one he is most comfortable in. Through this liberty, a child may pick up on the fundamental subjects subconsciously, without having to be drilled.

For example, instead of teaching an adolescent directly about multiplicative inverses of numbers, one could instead show her the merits of the golden mean and how it is often seen in nature and architecture. After a certain interest be developed, one would explain the mathematical elements behind the golden mean. Or instead of teaching a child the basic elements of a story as the beginning, middle, and end (which can often be ambiguous and confusing, and differ from story to story), one might begin with the simple three-act story structure and, in time, proceed to the four-act story structure.

Cultural Persuasion
Borrowing from Highlights for Children and other children's magazines, Academy Earth attempts to instill ethics into young readers, not by direct means, but by featuring stories that exhibit moral values. Academy Earth also tries to instill an interest in culture, featuring historical articles, and tolerance of the world's peoples. The vast curriculum encourages a child to take an interest in many subjects.

References

External links
Academy Earth
School Reading List

Children's magazines published in the United States
Quarterly magazines published in the United States
Magazines established in 2006
Education magazines